Kenneth Bell may refer to:

 Kenneth B. Bell (born 1956), Florida Supreme Court Justice
 Kenneth D. Bell (born 1958), United States District Judge
 Kenneth Norman Bell (1884–1951), fellow of Balliol College, Oxford
 Ken Bell (1914–2000), Canadian photographer who participated in the Normandy Landings
 Ken Bell (American football) (born 1964), American football return specialist
 Kenny Bell (born 1992), American football wide receiver